Emberá (also known as Chocó) is a dialect continuum spoken by 100,000 people in northwestern Colombia and southeastern Panama. It belongs to the Choco language family.

Embera, Emperã, Empena, Eberã, Epena, etc. is the Embera word for 'human being' or 'man' and is used as the autonym by all speakers of varieties of Embera (though not by the related Wounaan). It is also sometimes used to refer to other indigenous people who are not of Emberá ethnicity.

Languages and regional variation
Emberá is usually divided into at least two major groupings:

 Northern Emberá
 Southern Emberá

Each has a few regional varieties. These varieties are sometimes considered dialects but are actually distinct languages. The Archive of the Indigenous Languages of Latin America lists them as follows, along with alleged sub-varieties which may be places, extinct groups, or misspellings:

 Northern (Northern Antioquia, Emberá norteño)
 Catío (Katío): Dabeiba, Tukurá (Río Verde, upper Sinú, Emberá-Katío), Ngverá (San Jorge)
 Northern Emberá (Citará, Northwest Embera, West Embera): Darién (Sambú, Panamá Embera), Citará (Atrato, Andágueda), Juradó
 Southern
 Chamí (Caramanta, Embera-Chamí, East Embera, Southern Antioquia): Tadó*, Cristianía, Upper Andágueda, Mistrató, Garrapatas
 Baudó: Catrú, Dubasa, Purricha, Pavaja
 Eperara (Epena): Joaquincito, Cajambre, Naya, Saija, Tapaje, Satinga

Ethnologue (2005, 2009) treats Tadó (*) as a separate language. A case can be made for classifying Baudó in the Northern Embera group. It has many features of both groups and is partially intelligible with the neighboring Northern Embera dialect as well as with Epena.

Bibliography

 The archive of the indigenous languages of Latin America. (Web page: www.ailla.utexas.org/site/sa_lg_tbl.html, accessed 2005, Dec. 27).
 Aguirre Licht, Daniel. (1999). Embera. Languages of the World/materials 208. LINCOM. 
 Campbell, Lyle. (1997). American Indian languages: The Historical Linguistics of Native America. New York: Oxford University Press. .
 Gunn, Robert D. (Ed.). (1980). Clasificación de los idiomas indígenas de Panamá, con un vocabulario comparativo de los mismos. Lenguas de Panamá (No. 7). Panama: Instituto Nacional de Cultura, Instituto Lingüístico de Verano. 
 Kaufman, Terrence. (1994). The Native Languages of South America. In C. Mosley & R. E. Asher (Eds.), Atlas of the World's Languages (pp. 46–76). London: Routledge.
 Loewen, Jacob. (1963). Choco I & Choco II.  International Journal of American Linguistics, 29.
 Mortensen, Charles A. (1999). A Reference Grammar of the Northern Embera languages. Studies in the Languages of Colombia (No.7); SIL Publications in Linguistics (No. 134). SIL.
 Pardo Rojas, Mauricio y Aguirre, Daniel L. (1993). "Dialectología chocó". Biblioteca Ezequiel Uricoechea 11: 269-312. Bogotá: ICC. 
 Sara, Solomon (2001). A Tri-Lingual Dictionary of Emberá-Spanish-English. Lincom Europa.

See also
 Embera-Wounaan, who speak the Embera and Wounaan languages

References

External links 
 Audio recordings of "traditional narratives and myths" in Embera with some Spanish translations, part of the Emberá Collection of Rachel Crandell at AILLA. 
Embera (Intercontinental Dictionary Series)

Choco languages
Embera-Wounaan
Indigenous languages of Central America
Indigenous languages of the South American Northwest